Shell is a census-designated place (CDP) in Big Horn County, Wyoming, United States. The population was 83 at the 2010 Census.

The community is named for the abundance of fossil shells located in the area. Nearby exposed formations such as the Cloverly Formation and the Morrison Formation have yielded numerous fossils of dinosaurs and other animals.  Located to the west of the town is the Red Gulch Dinosaur Tracksite, a rare collection of dinosaur tracks from the Jurassic period.

Shell is home to the Iowa State University geology field station.

Geography
According to the United States Census Bureau, in 2010 the CDP has a total area of 1.1 square miles (2.96 km), all land.

Shell is located at the base of the Big Horn Mountains, at the mouth of Shell Canyon. Nearby Shell Creek rises in the Big Horn Mountains and joins the Big Horn River just north of Greybull.

Climate

According to the Köppen Climate Classification system, Shell has a cold semi-arid climate, abbreviated "BSk" on climate maps.

References

Census-designated places in Big Horn County, Wyoming
Census-designated places in Wyoming